Saint John the Baptist Church is a Catholic parish church in Lanckorona, Poland, erected in 1336.

References

External links 
 

14th-century Roman Catholic church buildings in Poland
Wadowice County